Patinopecten is a genus of bivalves belonging to the family Pectinidae.

The genus is found in Japan and Western America.

Species:

Patinopecten caurinus 
Patinopecten lituyaensis

References

Pectinidae
Bivalve genera